Heidi Köpfer (born 1954 in Basel) is a Swiss choreographer, dancer and video artist.

Life and work 
From 1975 to 1980 Heidi Köpfer studied various dance techniques in Switzerland and abroad. She has been teaching dance since 1977. From 1977 to 1987 she worked as a teacher and assistant at the Othella Dallas Dance School Basel. In 1988 she began to explore the artistic possibilities of the media dance and video and worked with these media in educational institutions. In 1987 she founded her own school for dance in Basel. She creates her own video projects and multimedia productions with other artists.

Recognition and awards 
Motion received a prize at the "5th Film- und Videotage der Region Basel", in 1989 and the main prize in all categories at the "Festival "Semana Internacional de Cine" in Teruel, Spain, in 1990. Changes was awarded at the "Ecrans sans frontières" festival in Mulhouse, France in 1998. Intermezzo received the "Hans-Züllig Prize" for the best dance film as well as the "International Jury Award" at the "51st Mostra del Cortometraggio di Montecatini", "FILMVIDEO 2000" in Italy and also in 2000 the "Prix Eurorégion" at the 18th international French-Spanish "Festival Vidéo D'Estavar-Llivia". Her dance films have been shown at around 250 festivals and events worldwide until 2019, broadcast by various television stations (SF DRS, 3-sat, TSI, Channel 4, VOX etc.) and are part of video collections.

Choreography and dance (selection) 
 1977-1985 Performances as a dancer with Othella Dallas, Syrinx Dance Company, own dance group
 since 1980 choreographer
 since 1984 cooperation with photographers
 1989 Performance as solo dancer with the Teatro Clé in Freiburg i. B., Germany
 1990 solo dancer in the music video project "Grand Bazar" by Raymond A. Schlosser, Zurich
 1991 dance solo "Begegnung", Kaserne Basel
 1993 dance solo "verstrickt", Modern Dance Night, World Dance Festival Basel
 solo dancer in the multimedia performance "for some reason", Kaserne Basel (video: Mirek Pazdera, live electronics: Günter Müller)
 Dance solo "Mobile I", Theaterhaus Gessnerallee Zurich, Kaserne Basel
 1994 solo dancer in the multimedia performance "record-rewind-PLAY", Zurich, Geneva, Basel (video: Brian D. Goff, live electronics: Günter Müller)
 1995, dance solo "Mobile II", Kaserne Basel, Théâtre de l'Arsenic, Lausanne
 since 1997 collaboration with visual artists
 1997 dancer in the multimedia performance "spheres & mouvements", Sudhaus/Warteck Basel (projection: Heinz Schäublin, sound composition: Urs Rickenbacher)
 Participation in the Mörser Project Basel with the dance solos "Waterworks" and "Hag"
 solo dancer in the multimedia performance "Das rote Ding", Kaserne Basel (projection: Heinz Schäublin, sound composition: Urs Rickenbacher)
 1998-2005 solo dancer in the intermedia photo projects "Camouflage" and "Megacity", various exhibitions (photography: Jean-Pierre Addor, projection: Heinz Schäublin)
 2000 solo dancer in the audio-visual show "danse obscure", Performing Art Night, Unternehmen Mitte Basel and Gundeldinger Kunsthalle Basel (visual design: Heinz Schäublin, photography: Jean-Pierre Addor, sound composition: Urs Rickenbacher)
 2002 solo dancer in the multimedia performance "Mutations" (projection: Heinz Schäublin, sound composition: Urs Rickenbacher), various performances
 2003 solo dancer at the Galerie Werkstatt Reinach (installation: Heinz Schäublin, live music: Felix Probst)
 2005 dance solo "Transition I", Kaserne Basel
 2006 solo dancer in the photo projects "Körperzelle" and "Flucht" (Photography: Rolf Bürgin)
 2008 solo dancer in the multimedia performance "Alice" (Projection: Heinz Schäublin, Sounds: Tassilo Dellers), Imprimerie Basel
 dancer in the photo project "Swan Lake" by Michael Koritschan
 2009 solo dancer in the multimedia performance "Im Garten Wunderland", Unternehmen Mitte Basel (performance, voice, sound: Nicoletta Stalder)
 2010 dance solo "ZwischenRaum I", E-Werk Freiburg i. B., Germany (live marimba: Hartmut Nold)
 2012 dance solo "ZwischenRaum II", Unternehmen Mitte Basel (live marimba: Hartmut Nold)
 2012/13/16 Interactive dance performance "metoso", Werkraum Warteck pp Basel, Reithalle Bern, Kulturhaus Royal Baden (audiovisual installation: Michel Winterberg)
 2019 Choreography "Just Bees and Things and Flowers", duet with the dancer Jeremy Nedd, Theater Roxy, Birsfelden
 2020 Art Omi: Dance Residency, Omi International Arts Center, USA

Works in collections and online 
 Sammlung Neue Medien Baselland, Switzerland
 Heure Exquise !: International centre for video arts
 SAPA Foundation, Swiss Archive of the Performing Arts, SAPA Foundation, Fonds
 Swiss Performing Arts Archive, SAPA Foundation, Dossier
 New York Public Library for the Performing Arts, Jerome Robbins Dance Division
 German Dance Film Institute Bremen
 German Dance Archive, Cologne
 International Music and Media Centre (IMZ), Vienna

Videos 
 1989: Motion, 13 minutes, Beta SP
 1991: Puzzle, 13 minutes, Beta SP
 1994: Mikado, 12 minutes, Beta SP
 1996: Changes, 15 minutes, Beta SP
 1999: Intermezzo, 13 minutes, Beta SP
 2001: Whatsoever, 17 minutes, Digital Beta
 2004: Korewori, 17 minutes, Digital Beta
 2007: Walls, 13 minutes, DVCPRO50-DV
 2011: Wind choreography, 1 minute, DV, in collaboration with Nicoletta Stalder
 2018: Mara, 15 minutes, QT HD-DCP, 25p

Literature 
 Basel tanzt anders, published by IG Tanz Basel/Tanz-Kampagne, Schwabe, 
 Megacity, Heinz Schäublin, Ute Stoecklin, Jean-Pierre Addor, Heidi Köpfer, Edition Hirschkuh, www.edition.ch, 
 Lexikon der Schweizerischen Tanzschaffenden, Alain Bernard, Traber Verlag Bern, 
 Schweizer Tanz-Ensembles & Solokünster/innen, Bulletin 5'94, Swiss Umbrella Association of Artistic Dance Professionals SDT
 Cut, Film- und Videomacherinnen Schweiz von den Anfängen bis 1994. Eine Bestandesaufnahme, Stroemfeld/Nexus, 
 Videotanz, Panorama einer intermedialen Kunstform, by Claudia Rosiny, Theatrum Helveticum 5, edited by Andreas Kotte, Institute, 
 WRO 97 VI International Media Art Biennale, OPEN STUDIO and Contributors, 
 L'art Vidéo 1980–1999, Vingt ans du Video Art Festival, Locarno Recherches, théories, perspectives sous * la direction de Vittorio Fagone, 1999, 
 Tanz + Bildende Kunst, Aspekte der Wechselbeziehung - Kunst und Kulturwissenschaft in der Gegenwart by Nele Lipp, EBOOK Athena,

References 

Living people
1954 births
Swiss female dancers
Swiss choreographers
Swiss video artists
People from Basel-Stadt
Women choreographers
Women video artists
20th-century dancers
Swiss contemporary artists